"Any Old Port in a Storm" is a popular song composed by Kerry Mills with lyrics by Arthur J. Lamb. Published in 1908, it has been recorded many times. The lyrics as published:

References

Bibliography
Lamb, Arthur J. (w); Mills, Kerry (m). "Any Old Port In A Storm". New York: F.A. Mills (1908).

1908 songs
Songs with music by Kerry Mills
Songs with lyrics by Arthur J. Lamb